The 22nd Huading Awards ceremony was held on May 18, 2017 at Suzhou.

Nominations and winners
Complete list of nominees and winners (denoted in bold)

References

2017 television awards
2017 in Chinese television
Huading Awards